Undercover  is a 2019 Belgian-Dutch Dutch-language crime drama streaming television series starring Tom Waes, Anna Drijver and Frank Lammers. The plot revolves around a story inspired by real-life events, where undercover agents infiltrate a drug kingpin's operation in Limburg, a Flemish province bordering the Netherlands. The infiltration is executed by two agents, Bob Lemmens (Tom Waes) and Kim de Rooij (Anna Drijver), who are posing as a couple at the campground where the drug kingpin spends his weekends.

It is a co-production between Netflix and public Belgium TV station Eén, and was ordered direct-to-series. The first season premiered on Eén on February 24, 2019, in Belgium; its second season is scheduled for a September 6, 2020 release on Eén. The series began streaming on Netflix on May 3, 2019. It was renewed for a second season which premiered on November 8, 2020. Season 3 premiered in November 2021, starring Nazmiye Oral.

Cast

Season 1
Tom Waes as Bob Lemmens
Anna Drijver as Kim De Rooij
Frank Lammers as Ferry Bouwman
Elise Schaap as Danielle Bouwman
Raymond Thiry as John Zwart
Robbie Cleiren as Marc Gevers
Manou Kersting as Nick Janssens
Katrien De Ruysscher as Liesbeth Mertens
Huub Smit as Dennis de Vries
Lieke van den Broek as Sonja van Kamp
Sara De Bosschere as Lena Vandekerckhove
Kevin Janssens as Jurgen van Kamp
Kris Cuppens as Walter Devos
Nina Mensch as Jezebel van Kamp
Emma Verlinden as Polly Lemmens
Warre Verlinden as David Lemmens

Season 2
 Wim Willaert as Laurent Berger
 Sebastien Dewaele as Jean-Pierre Berger
 Ruth Becquart as Nathalie Geudens
 Celest Henri Cornelis as Jackson Geudens
 Chris Lomme as Yvet Berger
 Sarah Vandeursen as Betty
 Robrecht Vanden Thoren as T-Bone
 Mourade Zeguendi as Vincent Messaoudi
 Sanne Samina Hanssen as Lisa

Season 3
 Nazmiye Oral as Leyla Bulut
 Murat Seven as Serkan Bulut
 Gökhan Girginol as Timur Celik
 Gökhan Kizilbuga as Mehmet
 Yannick van de Velde as Lars van Marken
 Wouter Hendrickx as Tanguy Dupont
 Jeroen van der Ven as Patrick Diericks

Episodes

Season 1 (2019)

Season 2 (2020)

Season 3 (2021)

Release
The full first season consisting of 10 episodes premiered on Netflix streaming on May 3, 2019.

Prequel
In May 2021, Netflix released Ferry, a film prequel to the series.

References

External links

2019 Dutch television series debuts
2010s crime drama television series
Eén original programming
Dutch-language Netflix original programming